Richard Greenblatt (born 1953) is a Canadian playwright who currently lives in Toronto.  He is best known for 2 Pianos, 4 Hands, which he wrote and performed with Ted Dykstra.

Early life 
Greenblatt was born in 1953 in Montreal, Quebec, to a secular Jewish family. His parents were active Communists until 1956, when they left the party after Khrushchev's Secret Speech. He is the brother of Lewis Furey, musician, actor & director.

Greenblatt attended Dawson College. He later trained at the Royal Academy of Dramatic Art in London. In 1975 he returned to Canada and began his theatrical career.

Works
Soft Pedalling (1981)
The Theory of Relatives (1994, co-written with Daniel Brooks, Diane Flacks, Leah Cherniak, Leslie Lester, and Allan Merovitz)
2 Pianos, 4 Hands (1994)
Sibs (2000)
Letters From Lehrer (2006)

Personal life 
Greenblatt was married to director/writer Kate Lushington. The two have three children: Natasha, William, and Luke.

See also 
List of Canadian writers
List of Canadian playwrights

References

External links
Profile from Canadian Theatre Encyclopaedia

20th-century Canadian dramatists and playwrights
21st-century Canadian dramatists and playwrights
1953 births
Living people
Jewish Canadian writers
Dawson College alumni
Jewish Canadian male actors
Alumni of RADA
Canadian male dramatists and playwrights
Male actors from Montreal
Writers from Montreal
20th-century Canadian male writers
21st-century Canadian male writers